James Franklin Fulbright (January 24, 1877 – April 5, 1948) was a U.S. Representative from Missouri.

Born near Millersville, Missouri, Fulbright attended the public schools and was graduated from the State Normal School, Cape Girardeau, Missouri, in 1900.
He taught school in Cape Girardeau and Ripley Counties for several years.
He attended the Washington University School of Law, for a short time.
He was admitted to the bar in 1903 and commenced practice in Doniphan, Missouri, in 1904.
He was appointed and subsequently elected prosecuting attorney of Ripley County in 1906.
He was reelected in 1908 and 1910.
He served as member of the State house of representatives 1913-1919, serving as speaker pro tempore 1915-1919.
He served as mayor of Doniphan, Missouri from 1919 to 1921.

Fulbright was elected as a Democrat to the Sixty-eighth Congress (March 4, 1923 – March 3, 1925).
He was an unsuccessful candidate for reelection in 1924 to the Sixty-ninth Congress.

Fulbright was elected to the Seventieth Congress (March 4, 1927 – March 3, 1929).
He was an unsuccessful candidate for reelection in 1928 to the Seventy-first Congress.

Fulbright was elected to the Seventy-second Congress (March 4, 1931 – March 3, 1933).
He was an unsuccessful candidate for renomination in 1932.
He resumed the practice of law.
He served as delegate to the Democratic National Convention in 1928.
Permanent chairman of the Democratic State convention in 1936.

Fulbright was elected judge of the Springfield Court of Appeals in 1936 and served from January 1, 1937, until his death in Springfield, Missouri, April 5, 1948.
He was interred in Doniphan Cemetery, Doniphan, Missouri.

References

1877 births
1948 deaths
Mayors of places in Missouri
People from Doniphan, Missouri
Democratic Party members of the United States House of Representatives from Missouri
Democratic Party members of the Missouri House of Representatives
Washington University School of Law alumni
People from Cape Girardeau County, Missouri
Washington University in St. Louis alumni